Leigh Haussen is an Australian rules football umpire currently officiating in the Australian Football League.

He made his senior South Australian National Football League umpiring debut in 2010 and went on to umpire over 160 SANFL games, including the 2010, '11, '12, '13, '15, and '16 Grand Finals. He was on the AFL umpiring rookie list from at least 2012 to 2014, officiating his first game, substituted on as an emergency umpire for Scott Jeffery, in 2014. He was not AFL-listed in 2015, before returning to the rookie list in 2016. In 2017, he was added to the senior umpiring list following Jordan Bannister's retirement, and made his debut as a non-emergency umpire that year, umpiring 11 matches that season.

References

Living people
Australian Football League umpires
Year of birth missing (living people)